Laura Arizmendi Campos (born 6 December 1954) is a Mexican politician from the Citizens' Movement. From 2009 to 2012 she served as Deputy of the LXI Legislature of the Mexican Congress representing Guerrero.

References

1954 births
Living people
Politicians from Guerrero
Women members of the Chamber of Deputies (Mexico)
Citizens' Movement (Mexico) politicians
21st-century Mexican politicians
21st-century Mexican women politicians
Deputies of the LXI Legislature of Mexico
Members of the Chamber of Deputies (Mexico) for Guerrero